The lentiform nucleus, or lenticular nucleus, comprises the putamen and the globus pallidus within the basal ganglia. With the caudate nucleus, it forms the dorsal striatum. It is a large, lens-shaped mass of gray matter just lateral to the internal capsule.

Structure
When divided horizontally, it exhibits, to some extent, the appearance of a biconvex lens, while a coronal section of its central part presents a somewhat triangular outline.

It is shorter than the caudate nucleus and does not extend as far forward.

Boundaries
It is lateral to the caudate nucleus and thalamus, and is seen only in sections of the hemisphere.

It is bounded laterally by a lamina of white substance called the external capsule, and lateral to this is a thin layer of gray substance termed the claustrum.

Its anterior end is continuous with the lower part of the head of the caudate nucleus and with the anterior perforated substance.

Components
In a coronal section through the middle of the lentiform nucleus, two medullary laminae are seen dividing it into three parts.

The lateral and largest part is of a reddish color, and is known as the putamen, while the medial and intermediate are of a yellowish tint, and together constitute the globus pallidus; all three are marked by fine radiating white fibers, which are most distinct in the putamen.

Function

Pathology

Increased volume of the lentiform nuclei has been observed in obsessive–compulsive disorder, with decreased volume conversely observed in other anxiety disorders.
The lentiform nucleus is also involved in the pathology of Wilson's disease as it is one of the neuroanatomical locations of copper deposition.

Etymology

The name comes from Latin and means lens-shaped, probably referring to the appearance of the nucleus from the side.

Gallery

See also
Striatum

References

External links

 

Basal ganglia